Anam, or Pondoma, is a Papuan language of Madang Province, Papua New Guinea.

References

External links 
 Anam Swadesh List by The Rosetta Project at the Internet Archive
 Anam Lexicon at TransNewGuinea.org

Pomoikan languages
Languages of Madang Province